Kostas Karipis (Constantinople, Ottoman Empire, 1880 – 1952) was a Greek guitarist and singer, of the genre of rembetiko (ρεμπέτικο) in particular. It is believed that he died in 1952.

References

1880 births
1952 deaths
Turkish people of Greek descent
Greek songwriters
Rebetiko musicians
Singers from Istanbul
Constantinopolitan Greeks
Greek guitarists
20th-century Greek male singers
20th-century guitarists
Emigrants from the Ottoman Empire to Greece